Wanja Ronald Ngah (born 12 September 1991) is a Cameroonian footballer who plays as a striker.

Club career

Kedah Darul Aman
On 21 January 2022, Ronald Ngah signed for Malaysia Super League club Kedah Darul Aman. He scored on his Malaysia Super League debut against Sarawak United in a 1-0 away win on 4 March.

Career statistics

Club

Honours

Individual
 Jordan Premier League top scorer: 2021 (15 goals)

References

External links
 
 

1991 births
Living people
People from Southwest Region (Cameroon)
Cameroonian footballers
Association football forwards
Coton Sport FC de Garoua players
Al Jahra SC players
Qadsia SC players
Smouha SC players
Al-Mujazzal Club players
Al-Salt SC players
Elite One players
Kuwait Premier League players
Egyptian Premier League players
Saudi First Division League players
Jordanian Pro League players
Cameroon international footballers
Cameroonian expatriate footballers
Cameroonian expatriate sportspeople in Kuwait
Cameroonian expatriate sportspeople in Egypt
Cameroonian expatriate sportspeople in Saudi Arabia
Cameroonian expatriate sportspeople in Jordan
Expatriate footballers in Kuwait
Expatriate footballers in Egypt
Expatriate footballers in Saudi Arabia
Expatriate footballers in Jordan
2016 African Nations Championship players
Cameroon A' international footballers